The Best of the Spinners is the name of several compilations, including:

The Best of the Spinners (1973 album), released on Motown, covering 1960s singles and their first two studio albums
The Best of the Spinners (1978 album), released on Atlantic, covering the 1970s studio albums on Atlantic produced by Thom Bell